Avtar Gill (born July 17, 1952) is a Canadian former professional darts player.

Career 
Gill was runner-up in the 1986 Canada National Championships losing to Bob Sinnaeve in the final.  Gill played in the 1987 World Professional Darts Championship, losing in the first round 3–1 in sets to Belgium's Frans Devooght. Gill played in 1997 on the PDC World Matchplay lost in the Last 40 to Andy Jenkins from England by 3–6.

World Championship results

BDO 
 1987: Last 32 (lost to Frans Devooght 1–3)

External links 
Profile and stats on Darts Database

Canadian darts players
1952 births
Living people
Professional Darts Corporation associate players
British Darts Organisation players

cs:Avtar Gill